Oh What a Lovely War may refer to one of a number of fictional works:

 Oh, What a Lovely War! - a stage musical created in 1963 by Joan Littlewood and her Theatre Workshop
 Oh! What a Lovely War - a cinematic adaptation from 1969 of the stage musical, directed by Richard Attenborough